Nallathambi is a 1949 Indian Tamil-language film starring and produced by N. S. Krishnan. The film's script was written by C. N. Annadurai (later chief minister of Tamil Nadu). This film marked Annadurai's debut in Tamil films. The movie is an adaptation of 1936 American movie Mr. Deeds Goes to Town.

Plot 
Nallathambi (NSK) a simple rural man inherits an estate from his deceased Zamindar relative. The Zamindar's daughter Pushpa (Bhanumathi) falls in love with Nallathambi. However he loves another girl (T. A. Madhuram). Bhoopathy (Sahasranamam) the estate manager has his eye on the wealth and tries to cheat Nallathambi out of it. He goads Pushpa into filing a suit that Nallathambi is mentally insane. In the end Nallathambi defeats Bhoopathy's machinations.

Cast 

Adapted from the film credits:

Male Cast
 N. S. Krishnan as Zamindar Thambidurai
 S. V. Sahasranamam as Bhoopathi
 D. V. Narayanasami
 Pulimootai Ramasami as Thambidurai's friend
 Kaka Radhakrishnan as Beggar
 C. S. Pandian

Female Cast
 T. A. Mathuram as Rani
 P. Bhanumathi as Pushpa
 M. N. Rajam as Orphan
 T. K. Kantha
 S. R. Janaki

Production 
Tamil film actor and Annadurai's friend M.Nallathambi saw the 1936 film Mr. Deeds Goes to Town which was having a successful theatrical run in the late 1940s in Madras. He thought it would be a good story to remake for his friend N.S.Krishnan (NSK). He convinced Annadurai to watch the movie and adapt the film to a Tamil rural setting. The film was titled as Nallathambi (lit. The good younger brother). However, during filming, NSK heavily modified the script, reducing the role of the character played by Bhanumathi Ramakrishna and introducing another character to be played by his wife and comedian T. A. Mathuram. The script was further changed to include a number of musical skits to bring out the social satire of NSK. "Vinganatha Valarkka porendi" (lit. I am going to the develop science) and Kindanar kathakalatchepam  (a parody of the story of Nandanar and a telling of B. R. Ambedkar's life story) were two of the musical skits thus included. With the modifications, the plot was sidelined and importance was given to the socio-political messages and themes. The director duo of R. Krishnan and S. Panju were hired to direct the film. C. R. Subburaman composed the music, while Udumalai Narayana Kavi wrote the lyrics for the songs. M. N. Rajam, Sahasranamam and V. K. Ramasamy were cast in supporting roles.

Reception 
The film was a commercial failure and a critical success. Its songs became hits and were popular. The musical skit "Kindanar Kalatchepam" became popular. To offset the financial loss of his backers, NSK announced a new film project titled Thambithurai to be written by Annadurai. However furious with the changes made to his Nallathambi script, Annadurai refused to work with NSK again.

Soundtrack 

The music was composed by C. R. Subbaraman. Lyrics by Udumalai Narayana Kavi and K. P. Kamatchi. Singers are N. S. Krishnan, T. A. Mathuram and P. Bhanumathi. Playback singers are Ghantasala, C. S. Jayaraman, M. M. Mariayappa and M. L. Vasanthakumari.

References

External links 

 

1949 films
Films directed by Krishnan–Panju
1940s Tamil-language films
Films scored by C. R. Subbaraman
Indian black-and-white films